This is a list of Scottish football transfers featuring at least one 2011–12 Scottish Premier League club or one 2011–12 Scottish First Division club which were completed after the end of the 2010–11 season and before the end of the 2011 summer transfer window.

May 2011 – August 2011

See also
 List of Scottish football transfers 2010–11
 List of Scottish football transfers winter 2011–12

References

Transfers
Scottish
2011 summer